Patricia A. Spafford Smith (August 17, 1925December 31, 2002) was an American businesswoman and Democratic politician from Shell Lake, Wisconsin.

Background 
Born Patricia A. Spafford in Shell Lake on August 17, 1925, Smith attended Superior State Teachers College (now University of Wisconsin–Superior) and graduated from the University of Minnesota with a BBA in 1946; she also later attended the Barron County branch, as well as the main campus, of the University of Wisconsin–Eau Claire. After graduation, Smith worked as an accountant for the Wisconsin Department of Revenue, and later ran a school bus contracting business (she was on the board of directors of the Wisconsin School Bus Association). At the time of her first election to public office, she had a record of leadership in organizations including Wisconsin Citizens Concerned for Life, Barron County Sports Center, Barron Co. Health Forum, Barron County Adult 4-H Leaders Association, Boy Scouts and Girl Scouts, and the Barron County Democratic Party.

Public office 
She was first elected to the Wisconsin State Assembly's 75th district in 1978; she won a plurality in a five-way Democratic primary, then defeated Republican Glenn A. Johnson, with 8,344 votes to his 7,661. (Previous incumbent Kenneth M. Schricker had died in office.) She was narrowly re-elected in 1980; after a recount, she had 12,840 votes to 12,671 for Republican Alan Sykes. In 1982, in what was now numbered the 51st district, she had less trouble, polling 8,870 to 7,735 for Republican Ole Severude. In 1984, with the district once again numbered the 75th, she was not a candidate, and was succeeded by fellow Democrat Mary Hubler (who had defeated a Patrick T. Smith in the Democratic primary).

After she left the Assembly, Smith served on the Washburn County, Wisconsin Board of Supervisors, the Shell Lake Common Council and served as Mayor of Shell Lake.

Personal life 
She married James W. Smith on October 22, 1949; he died in 1969, leaving her a widow with six children. She died December 31, 2002. Ten years later, her son Stephen J. Smith (also a business owner and accountant) was elected to the Wisconsin State Assembly as a Democrat to represent the same district his mother had represented.

Notes

1925 births
2002 deaths
American accountants
Women accountants
People from Shell Lake, Wisconsin
University of Wisconsin–Superior alumni
Carlson School of Management alumni
Businesspeople from Wisconsin
County supervisors in Wisconsin
Wisconsin city council members
Mayors of places in Wisconsin
Women mayors of places in Wisconsin
Women state legislators in Wisconsin
Democratic Party members of the Wisconsin State Assembly
University of Wisconsin–Eau Claire alumni
Women in finance
20th-century American politicians
Women city councillors in Wisconsin
20th-century American women politicians
20th-century American businesspeople